USS Mallard is a name of two U.S. Navy vessels:

 , a minesweeper, served in the Navy 1919–1946.
 , a landing craft, later a mine detector, served in the Navy 1944–1960.

References 

United States Navy ship names